Gent–Wevelgem, officially Gent–Wevelgem – In Flanders Fields, is a road cycling race in Belgium, held annually since 1934. It is one of the classic races part of the Flemish Cycling Week, run in late March on the last Sunday before the Tour of Flanders.

Although the event is often called a sprinters classic due to its flat finishing terrain, its early-season date means riders are often tested by wind and rain, as well as several climbs, including two ascents of the steep and fully cobbled Kemmelberg. As a result, few editions of Gent–Wevelgem actually end in a bunch sprint – often the winner comes from a small group of escapees.

In 2005 the race was included in the inaugural UCI ProTour and in 2011 in its successor, the UCI World Tour. Since 2011 it is organized by Flanders Classics, which also organizes the Tour of Flanders. Since 2012 a woman's event is held on the same day as the men's race.

Six riders share the record of victories. Belgians Robert Van Eenaeme, Rik Van Looy, Eddy Merckx and Tom Boonen, Italian Mario Cipollini and Slovak Peter Sagan each won the race three times. Sagan also achieved a record six podium finishes in the race.

History

Amateur event

Created in 1934 and originally run by the newspaper Gazet van Antwerpen, the race's finish town of Wevelgem was selected because it was the home town of the event's first owner, local textile manufacturer Georges Matthijs.  Its origin is a tribute to Gaston Rebry, a native of Wevelgem, who was one of the stars of cycling in Belgium in the 1930s.

The first edition was run on 9 September 1934 as an amateur race on a flat, 120 km route. The race only had Belgian participants and was won by Gustave Van Belle. In 1936 the race distance was increased to 168 km and Robert Van Eenaeme was the first professional winner.

Spring classic
The event had its only interruptions during World War II, and was subsequently organized again as a professional event in 1945. Gaston Rebry, by then president of bike club "Het Vliegend Wiel", was the new race director. Robert Van Eenaeme was declared winner of the first post-War edition, surprisingly ten days after the race was over, after officials had closer inspected the photo finish.

In 1947 Gent–Wevelgem was granted a springtime date on the calendar and gained prestige. Organizer Rebry managed to line up Italian cycling icons Gino Bartali and Fausto Coppi, who attracted vast numbers of spectators to the race.

In 1957 the race became part of the short-lived Trophy of Flanders, a two-day formula with the Omloop Het Volk, in which Gent–Wevelgem was raced on Saturday, the Omloop on Sunday. In the 1960s the race garnered international prestige. Belgian cycling legends Rik Van Looy and Eddy Merckx won the race three times; Tour de France winner Jacques Anquetil was the first French winner in 1964.

The race was in a constant search of identity and re-invention, as reflected in the regular route and calendar changes. In 1977 the distance was 277 km, the longest edition ever, featuring eleven climbs in the Flemish Ardennes and a double ascent of the Kemmelberg. The arduous edition was won by Bernard Hinault, claiming his first international success.

In Flanders Fields Classic
Since the 1980s the race has built a reputation as a sprinters' classic. Italian sprint star Mario Cipollini claimed three victories. Sean Kelly, Guido Bontempi, Djamolidine Abdoujaparov and Tom Steels are some of the other sprint specialists on the roll of honour.

In 2003, Gent–Wevelgem abandoned its original start location Ghent and moved to suburban Deinze. Tom Boonen claimed his first classic victory in 2004, later proceeding to equal the winning record of three wins. For many decades, the race held a mid-week position between the Tour of Flanders and Paris–Roubaix. In 2011, the race was included in the UCI World Tour and returned to a Sunday date in the weekend between Milan–San Remo and the Tour of Flanders.

Since 2015, the event is named Gent–Wevelgem – In Flanders Fields, after the iconic war poem by John McCrae. Organizers wanted to commemorate the 100th anniversary of World War I, as the Westhoek region was at the heart of the war and is home to several Commonwealth war graves. The 2015 edition was won by Luca Paolini, but was particularly memorable as it was run in abysmal weather, with strong winds scourging the peloton. Several riders were blown violently off their bikes, including Geraint Thomas when he was leading the breakaway group, prompting media to describe the race as "mayhem" and "one of the wildest bike races in recent years". Only 39 riders finished the race.

The 2016 edition was marred by the death of Belgian rider Antoine Demoitié, suffering fatal injuries from a crash and collision with a motor bike. Peter Sagan won the 2018 event, marking Sagan's third Gent–Wevelgem title and sixth podium finish, thereby becoming the most successful rider in the race's history.

Route

Unlike most of the Flemish spring classics, which centre around Oudenaarde and the plentiful hills in the Flemish Ardennes, Gent–Wevelgem travels west into West Flanders and Northern France and has fewer hills, providing it with a different character and making it more suitable for sprinters. In recent years the total distance of the race was around 250 km.

Present course
After the unofficial start on the city's Market Square, the route heads west, facing 100 kilometres through the wind-swept flatlands of West Flanders, up to and along the North Sea coast before turning south into the North department of France. After 120 km comes the cobbled Kasselberg climb in Cassel, which is addressed twice in quick succession. After the Katsberg, the second hill in France, the race re-enters Belgium after  on French roads, to enter the key section of the race in Heuvelland.

The hill zone in the very south of West Flanders holds three climbs, the Baneberg, Monteberg and Kemmelberg, covered within twelve kilometres of one another. This succession of climbs is interspersed with technical descents along narrow country roads, including the difficult descent of the Kemmelberg. The Kemmelberg is the hardest and most iconic climb of the race.

After these three bergs, the course loops round and riders re-ascend the Baneberg–Monteberg-Kemmelberg sequence, covering a total of nine categorized climbs. The finish is on the Vanackerestraat, Wevelgem's central avenue.

Character of the race
The essential ingredients of Gent–Wevelgem have remained the same for decades. First to take their toll on the peloton, in the opening 100 kilometres, are the crosswinds and often rainy weather on exposed, flat roads across Flanders’ largest open plain. As teams try to protect and position their captains in the early stages of the race, splits and echelons at this point frequently see 40 to 60 riders eliminated from the running.

Subsequently, after hours of pounding across the Flanders flatlands and the occasional excursion to Northern France, the riders approach the hill zone in Heuvelland, which features the day's most difficult ascents. The hills are at the heart of the action and usually the sites where breakaways are formed. The race's most renowned climb is the Kemmelberg, a fully cobbled hill road in Kemmel with gradients up to 23%, but equally notorious for its difficult and technical descent.

The Kemmelberg, the highest point in the region, is the toughest climb and the emotional centrepiece of the race. Named after Camulos, the Celtic god of war, the Kemmelberg's summit lies atop a thickly wooded ridge which was the scene of the Battle of the Lys in April 1918, in which more than 200,000 soldiers died. The climb has been controversial in the past because of several severe crashes in its descent. In 2007 French rider Jimmy Casper crashed heavily, suffering numerous facial and other fractures. In 2016 the climb was addressed by its steepest road for the first time in more than 20 years.

After the Kemmelberg, the ultimate battle between breakaways formed on the bergs and the chasing peloton unfolds on the 35-kilometre flat roads towards the finish. Despite its reputation as a sprinter's classic, Gent–Wevelgem's breakaways frequently hold off their pursuers because of the unpredictable terrain.

Cobbles

Although media usually classify Gent–Wevelgem as a cobbled classic, the route actually has very few sections of cobbled roads. Only the Kemmelberg and the upper stretches of the Kasselberg are cobbled, totaling a possible maximum of two kilometres of cobbled section, which is significantly less than the other cobbled races of Flanders and Northern France. Moreover, there are no flat sections of pavé and both cobbled climbs are in excellent condition, as they are part of a busy suburban traffic network.

Course changes
The first race was in 1934 on an all-flat route from Ghent's St Pieter's Station to Wevelgem. The second edition in 1935 addressed the Flemish Ardennes in East Flanders and included the climbs of Kwaremont, Kluisberg and Tiegemberg. From 1936 to 1939 the race ran from Ghent to Kortrijk, followed by local laps, including the Lauwberg as the main difficulty.

After World War II, Gent–Wevelgem restyled with a new route across the Flemish Ardennes and the Heuvelland region. The Edelareberg, Hoppeberg, Kwaremont, Zwarteberg and Rodeberg featured along the way. In 1947 and 1948 the course looped up to and along the North Sea coast for the first time.

From 1949 to 1954 the Flemish Ardennes returned, followed by the Heuvelland hills of Rodeberg and Vidaigneberg. In 1955 the Kluisberg and Kemmelberg made their first appearance. The road on the Kemmelberg was still unpaved. In 1956 the Eikenberg was included.

In 1957, as Gent–Wevelgem was part of the Trophy of Flanders, organizers introduced climbs in French Flanders: Zwarteberg, Mont Cassel, Katsberg and Wouwenberg preceded the Kemmelberg. In 1958, these Franco-Flemish climbs were not included: the pre-Schengen border crossing caused too many administrative burdens. After the run-up to the coast, the route featured only the Rodeberg, Vidaigneberg and Kemmelberg climbs in Heuvelland.

In 1960 scheduling conflicts marked the end of the Trophy of Flanders and the race placed itself on the calendar between the more prestigious classics the Tour of Flanders and Paris–Roubaix. In 1961 Gent–Wevelgem implemented a two-day course, a one-year novelty. The race ran from Ghent to Antwerp on the first day and to Wevelgem on the second.

From 1962 to 1976 Gent–Wevelgem ran via the coast to Heuvelland, with the Rodeberg, Vidaigneberg and Kemmelberg as fixed venues, sometimes supplemented with Monteberg, Baneberg, Sulferberg, Goeberg, Suikerberg (Sugar Hill), Kraaiberg and Scherpenberg.

In 1977, the hills of the Flemish Ardennes were addressed for the last time to date, featuring eleven significant climbs, including Koppenberg, Edelareberg, Kattenberg, Varent, Kluisberg and Tiegemberg. In 1993, the Franco-Flemish hills made their re-appearance but were omitted again in 1996.

In 2008, the route was substantially modified, following the race's status as a UCI Pro Tour event. The distance was increased from ca. 200 km to 235 km. The course no longer ran along long coastal stretches, but instead approached Veurne from the polders. More climbs in Heuvelland were inserted: Zwarteberg, Baneberg, Rodeberg, Vidaigneberg and Monteberg preceded the double ascent of the Kemmelberg. As a consequence of the heavy crashes of the 2007 race, the Kemmelberg was approached from the village of Kemmel, in order to avoid the dangerous cobbled descent and potential new crashes.

In 2010 the Franco-Flemish hills of Kasselberg, Scherpenberg, Katsberg, and Berthen were re-introduced, before ensuing the traditional route in the Heuvelland hills. In recent years the city of Ypres features prominently in the race finale. In the context of the Centenary of the outbreak of World War I, the peloton crosses the city centre and leaves it passing under the iconic Menin Gate, arguably the most famous Flanders Fields memorial, before proceeding on the final run-in to the finish in Wevelgem.

The 2017 race saw the addition of three so-called Plugstreets in Ploegsteert Wood, semi-paved gravel roads at the Ploegsteert Memorial to the Missing, to commemorate the Christmas truce of 1914.

The COVID-19 pandemic led to the change of calendar and that year's edition was postponed for the 11th of October.

Winners

Multiple winners 

Riders in italics are still active

Wins per country

Women's race

Since 2012 a women's race of Gent–Wevelgem is held, on the same day as the men's event but over a shorter course. Unlike the men's race, the start is in Ypres and the course does not cover the hills in Northern France. The inaugural women's edition was won by British rider Lizzie Armitstead after a 40-km solo breakaway. Since 2016 the race is included in the UCI Women's World Tour, cycling's top-tier female elite competition.

Wins per country

Cyclosportive
Since 2009, a cyclosportive is organized on the day before the professional event. There are four distances, ranging from 60 km to 215 km. All courses start and finish in Wevelgem, at the finishing location of the professional event. Most routes pass through the Menin Gate in Ypres, flirt with the French border, tackle the Kemmelberg before turning back towards Wevelgem. There are 5.000 participants on average; 40% of which are non-Belgians.

Notes

References

External links

 
Recurring sporting events established in 1934
1934 establishments in Belgium
UCI ProTour races
Classic cycle races
Cycle races in Belgium
UCI World Tour races
Annual sporting events in Belgium
Spring (season) events in Belgium
Super Prestige Pernod races